The 2011 Hull City Council election took place on 5 May 2011 to elect members of Hull City Council in England. One third of the council was up for election and Labour gained control of the council from the Liberal Democrats.

After the election, the composition of the council was
Labour 34
Liberal Democrat 22
Conservative 2
Independent 1

Ward results

No elections were held in Bricknell, St Andrews, Southcoates East and Southcoates West wards.

Avenue

Beverley

Boothferry

Bransholme East

Bransholme West

Derringham

Drypool

Holderness

Ings

Kings Park

Longhill

Marfleet

Myton

Newington

Newland

Orchard Park & Greenwood

Pickering

Sutton

University

References

2011 English local elections
2011
2010s in Kingston upon Hull
May 2011 events in the United Kingdom